is a Japanese footballer who plays for FC Ryukyu.

Club stats
Updated to end of 2018 season.

1 = Japanese Super Cup, Suruga Bank Championship and J2 League Promotion Play-Off appearances.

References

External links

1983 births
Living people
Komazawa University alumni
Association football people from Okinawa Prefecture
Japanese footballers
J1 League players
J2 League players
FC Tokyo players
Vegalta Sendai players
Gamba Osaka players
Fagiano Okayama players
FC Ryukyu players
Association football forwards